Bradley Neil Carnell (born 21 January 1977) is a South African former footballer who played as a defender. He is the current head coach of St. Louis City SC of Major League Soccer.

Early career 
Born in Johannesburg, Carnell attended Parktown Boys' High School in Johannesburg. The old Parktown boy played for Southern Suburbs and Robertsham Callies juniors as a goalkeeper and he was later converted to a defender. He was regularly selected to play at district levels being coached by former Southampton, Hereford United and Cheltenham Town winger and former Wits University manager Terry Paine.

Playing career 
Carnell made his professional debut at the age of 16 in 1993 playing for Wits University.
He played for Kaizer Chiefs (1997–98), VfB Stuttgart (1998–2003) and Borussia Mönchengladbach (2003–05). His greatest success came at Stuttgart where he helped win the league silver in 2003.  He was selected for the 2002 FIFA World Cup.

According to media reports, he was involved in an on-field altercation with a fellow player (goalkeeper Markus Miller) during a German league match in Frankfurt during September 2007.

In July 2009 he moved to F.C. Hansa Rostock. On 13 July 2010, he signed for SuperSport United F.C.

He announced his retirement from football on 27 August 2011.

Coaching 
On 28 March 2017, Carnell was announced as the new assistant coach of the New York Red Bulls of Major League Soccer. On 5 September 2020, a day after the firing of Chris Armas, he was named interim head coach for the remainder of the 2020 regular season.

On 5 January 2022, Carnell was announced as the first head coach of St. Louis City SC of Major League Soccer. The team kicked off in 2023.

Managerial statistics

Honours 
VfB Stuttgart
UEFA Intertoto Cup: 2000, 2002

References

External links 
 
 

2002 FIFA World Cup players
2002 African Cup of Nations players
Borussia Mönchengladbach players
Expatriate footballers in Germany
Bundesliga players
2. Bundesliga players
Association football defenders
Association football midfielders
Association football utility players
Kaizer Chiefs F.C. players
Karlsruher SC players
FC Hansa Rostock players
South African expatriate soccer players
South African expatriate sportspeople in Germany
South African soccer players
South Africa international soccer players
VfB Stuttgart players
Bidvest Wits F.C. players
SuperSport United F.C. players
1977 births
Living people
South African people of English descent
White South African people
Sportspeople from Johannesburg
Alumni of Parktown Boys' High School
New York Red Bulls non-playing staff
St. Louis City SC coaches